Waqutuyuq (Quechua waqutu a variety of potatoes, -yuq a suffix to indicate ownership, "the one with the waqutu", also spelled Huajotuyo) is a mountain in the Chunta mountain range in the Andes of Peru, about  high. It is located in the Huancavelica Region, Huancavelica Province, Huancavelica District, north of Antarasu. Waqutuyuq lies at a valley named Qarwa Q'asa ("yellowish valley", also spelled Carhuajasa). The waters of its intermittent stream flow to Kachimayu in the north.

References

Mountains of Huancavelica Region
Mountains of Peru